The Tonga Hockey Federation (THF) is the governing body of field hockey in Tonga, Oceania. Its headquarters are in Nuku'Alofa, Tonga. It is affiliated to IHF International Hockey Federation and OCF Oceania Hockey Federation.

Rev. Dr Tevita Mohenoa Puloka is the President of Hockey Association of Tonga and Rev. Ikani Taliai Tolu is the General Secretary.

History

See also
Oceania Hockey Federation

References

External links
 Tonga Hockey - FIH
 Tonga Hockey - FB

National members of the Oceania Hockey Federation
Hockey